Capitales del Fútbol (English: Football Capitals) is a documentary-series produced by ESPN's International Marketing Solutions group in collaboration with Juan José Campanella's studio 100Bares. The show, which profiles cities where football is a way of life, originally premiered across Latin America in April 2011. Entering a third season, the show has expanded to include the US. It is ESPN International's most successful original series ever with nearly 20 million viewers.

"Capitales" is both a travel documentary and a sports feature. 

The original season featured Buenos Aires, Madrid, Milan, and Rio de Janeiro. Capitales del Fútbol went on to become the all-time highest-rated original series in Latin America, leading to the return of both a second and third season.

Both seasons were released simultaneously on ESPN's Spanish-speaking network ESPN Deportes in 2012 and 2013. The Home Depot was the program's presenting sponsor. Branded segments introducing the show were integrated using the "Futbol Center Construido por The Home Depot" platform.

Episodes 

The episodes premiered in different orders across various regions.

Season 1 (2011)

The first season had a total of 7 million viewers.

Season 2 (2012)

The second season had a total of 11.5 million viewers.

Season 3 (2013)

Capitales del Fútbol was renewed for a third season, set to release in Latin America in 2013, with London being announced as the first capital.

Reception 

Capitales del Fútbol was an immediate success with more than seven million viewers tuning in during the first season, making it the highest rated original series ever in ESPN's history in Latin America. After two seasons, over 17 million viewers in Latin America had tuned in.

References 

Association football documentary television series